is a former Japanese Nippon Professional Baseball pitcher. He played for the Yomiuri Giants in 2007 and 2009.

References

External links
Career statistics and player information from Baseball-Reference

1983 births
Living people
Japanese baseball players
Nippon Professional Baseball pitchers
Yomiuri Giants players